Gray A. Brechin (born September 2, 1947) is an American geographer, architectural historian, and author. He is the founder and Project Scholar of The Living New Deal based at the U.C. Berkeley Department of Geography. Brechin is a frequent and popular speaker, especially on subjects related to the history and legacy of the New Deal and the history of San Francisco.

Brechin is known for his early work on the Mono Lake Committee to stop the destruction of Mono Lake by sending its water to Los Angeles. Brechin joined in 1978 as the first director, and lobbied in Sacramento with ecologist David Gaines and other committee members to save the lake. Brechin traveled California giving talks to publicize the lake's plight.

In 1992, Brechin and photographer Robert Dawson were awarded the Lange-Taylor Prize by Duke University, funding their collaboration on a five-year project that was published in March 1999 as Farewell, Promised Land: Waking from the California Dream. The San Diego Historical Society reviewed the book as a necessary reference "to all California environmentalists and policymakers", though its photographs and text focused largely on Northern California rather than the whole state.

Dawson and Brechin decided in 2002 to write a book documenting the many construction and beautification efforts of the 1930s sponsored by the New Deal programs of President Franklin Delano Roosevelt. In 2003, they realized the scope was too large for two people, and in 2006 Brechin created the collaborative project California Living New Deal so that many people could participate as volunteers. Retired software engineer Jay McCauley programmed a database-driven dynamically interactive map for the group. In 2011, the project was enlarged to include all of the United States, dropping the word "California" to become The Living New Deal. The database application was expanded by software engineers from UC Berkeley's Institute for Research on Labor and Employment. By 2020, the website had catalogued some 16,000 sites of New Deal construction and beautification.

Works
 Imperial San Francisco: Urban Power, Earthly Ruin (1999), University of California Press
Farewell, Promised Land: Waking from the California Dream (with photographer Robert Dawson), (1999) University of California Press. 
 The Living New Deal

References

External links 
 Gray Brechin, Ph. D. -- Historical Geographer & Author
"A look at the New Deal's local legacy", Episode 73 podcast by East Bay Yesterday

1947 births
Living people
Place of birth missing (living people)
American geologists
Architectural historians
New Deal in California